James or Jim West may refer to:

People
 James West (Australian journalist) (born 1982), Australian journalist and author
 James West (antiquary) (1703–1772), English politician and antiquary; president of the Royal Society
 James E. West (politician) (1951–2006), American politician; recalled former mayor of Spokane, Washington
 James E. West (Scouting) (1876–1948), first Chief Scout Executive of the Boy Scouts of America (BSA)
 James West (inventor) (born 1931), American co-inventor of the electret microphone
 James Grey West (1885–1951), British architect
 James West (football manager), British football manager
 James West (Canadian football) (born 1955), Canadian former football player
 James West (Scottish footballer) (1891–?), Scottish footballer
 James Marion West Sr. (1871–1941), Houston, Texas businessman and political figure
 James Marion West Jr. (1903–1957), his son, Houston businessman
 James R. West, American trumpet player and teacher
 Jim West (baseball) (1911–1970), American Negro league baseball player
 Jim West (biblical scholar) (born 1960), anti-death penalty activist, Christian pacifist, biblical scholar and blogger
 Jim West (boxer) (1954–2015), Australian boxer of the 1970s and 1980s
 Jim West (guitarist) (born 1953), American guitarist, film and TV composer
 Jim West (footballer) (born 1966), Australian former footballer
 James West (physician) (1914–2012), American physician, psychiatrist and surgeon
 Jim West (cricketer) (born 1982), Bermudian cricketer
 James West (golfer) (1885–1968), English golfer
 J. B. West (James Bernard West, 1912–1983), Chief Usher of the White House
 James West, drummer for the band Ghostwood

Characters
 James T. West, a fictional character on the television series The Wild Wild West and the motion picture Wild Wild West 
 James West, a soap opera character who is one of the children of General Hospital

See also
 Jeffrey James West (born 1950), former principal of historical buildings in England